Athenagoras was a Macedonian general of Philip V and Perseus. He fought against Dardani. and Romans

Notes

References
Dictionary of Greek and Roman Biography and Mythology

Antigonid generals
2nd-century BC Macedonians